Colombo Gallorini (3 June 1896 – 13 January 1953) was an Italian racing cyclist. He rode in the 1924 Tour de France.

References

External links
 

1896 births
Year of death missing
Italian male cyclists
Place of birth missing
Sportspeople from the Province of Grosseto
Cyclists from Tuscany